The Namco System 23 is an arcade system board produced and developed by Namco. Announced in 1996 and released in 1997, it was the last arcade system produced by the company that was based on their own custom design, as opposed to just derivatives of console or PC hardware. Like the System 22, the System 23 also featured a more powerful variant called the Super System 23. One of the advertised features of the System 23 was the "Gashin Strong Bass System," which was simply a bass amplifier hooked up to the sound system. It was succeeded by the Namco System 10 in 2000.

System 23 specifications

Main CPU: 133 MHz IDT R4650 64-bit. Super System 23 used a 166 MHz chip and Super System 23 Evolution 2 used a 200 MHz chip
Sound CPU: 16.9344 MHz Hitachi H8/3002
Sound Chip: Namco C352 Sample playback
I/O CPU: Gorgon and System 23 used Hitachi H8/3334 Super System 23 and Super System 23 Evolution 2 used PIC16Cxx
Extra I/O CPU: Hitachi SH-2 used only on Super System 23 GMEN
Graphics hardware: Namco-proprietary hardware
GPU: Multiple parallel VideoLogic PowerVR chips
Graphical capabilities: 2 million polygons per second, texture mapping, Gouraud shading

List of games

System 22.5 / Gorgon
 Final Furlong (1997)
 Rapid River (1997)

System 23
 Angler King (1998)
 Downhill Bikers (1997)
 Motocross Go! (1997)
 Panic Park (1997)
 Time Crisis II (System 23 Version) (1997)

Super System 23
 500GP (1998)
 Guitar Jam (1999)
 Time Crisis II (Super System 23 Version) (1997)

Super System 23 GMEN
 Final Furlong 2 (1999)
 Gunmen Wars (1998)
 Race On! (1998)

Super System 23 Evolution 2
 Crisis Zone (1999)

References

External links
System 23 at System16 - The Arcade Museum
Super System 23 at System16 - The Arcade Museum

Namco arcade system boards